Eldelumab (alternative identifier BMS-936557) is a fully human monoclonal antibody (type IgG1 kappa) that targets chemokine (C-X-C motif) ligand 10 (CXCL10)/Interferon-γ-inducible protein-10 (IP-10) designed for the treatment of Crohn's disease and ulcerative colitis. 

This drug was developed by Bristol-Myers Squibb and Medarex.

References 

Bristol Myers Squibb
Monoclonal antibodies